The former Odd Fellows Hall, located at 536 Massachusetts Avenue in Cambridge, Massachusetts, in the United States, is a historic building built in 1884 by members of the Independent Order of Odd Fellows. On April 13, 1982, it was added to the National Register of Historic Places. It is now The Dance Complex, founded by Rozann Kraus in 1991.

History
The building was built in 1884 by members of the Independent Order of Odd Fellows. Like many lodge halls of the time, it had business and commercial space on the ground floor while the lodge hall was upstairs.

Current use
The Odd Fellows Hall is now owned and run by the Dance Complex, which was formed to buy and save the building. The facilities include 6 dance studios and the  Julie Ince Thompson Theatre.

See also

 National Register of Historic Places listings in Cambridge, Massachusetts
 Odd Fellows Hall

References

External links
National Register listings for Middlesex County
 Dance Complex website
 Dance Complex history

Clubhouses on the National Register of Historic Places in Massachusetts
Buildings and structures in Cambridge, Massachusetts
Odd Fellows buildings in Massachusetts
National Register of Historic Places in Cambridge, Massachusetts
Hartwell and Richardson buildings